Asplenium hemionitis is a species of fern native to Macaronesia, Northwest Africa and mainland Portugal. It inhabits humid woods and other shady areas, sometimes in uncovered slopes subject to high ocean humidity.

Linnaeus was the first to describe the species with the binomial Asplenium hemionitis in his Species Plantarum of 1753.

References

Flora of Macaronesia
Flora of North Africa
Flora of Portugal
Taxa named by Carl Linnaeus
Plants described in 1753
hemionitis